The Battle of Prome was a battle during the Japanese conquest of Burma. China's Generalissimo, Chiang Kai-shek, believed "As long as the British hold Prome, we hold Toungoo."

Background
Japan invaded Burma in December 1941. First, the city of Tavoy's airfield was bombed by the Japanese. Shortly afterward, the Japanese invaded Victoria's Point, and slowly started to build up forces. On 14 January 1942, Japanese forces advanced into Burma.

After the loss at Toungoo, the remaining allies split the land up, and each defended their own city. The British Raj and British Burma got Prome, while Chinese forces went to the nearby Shwedaung.

The battle
After a victory at Shwedaung, the Japanese started firing at Prome on the night of 30 March. Despite British forces inflicting significant casualties, they withdrew to Allanmyo on 2 April.

References

Battles of World War II involving Japan
Prome
Military history of Burma during World War II
March 1942 events
April 1942 events
1942 in Burma